Celypha flavipalpana is a species of moth of the family Tortricidae. It is found in most of Europe, except Ireland, Great Britain, Fennoscandia, the Iberian Peninsula and most of the Balkan Peninsula.

The wingspan is 13–17 mm. Adults are on wing from June to August in one or possibly two generations per year.

The larvae are polyphagous. Recorded food plants include Calluna vulgaris, Thymus and Trifolium species.

References

External links

Lepiforum.de

Moths described in 1851
Olethreutini
Moths of Japan
Moths of Europe
Moths of Asia
Taxa named by Gottlieb August Wilhelm Herrich-Schäffer